Paolo Naldini, O.E.S.A. (15 October 1632 – 21 April 1713) was a Roman Catholic prelate who served as Bishop of Capodistria (1686–1713).

Biography
Paolo Naldini was born in Padua, Italy on 15 October 1632 and ordained a priest in the Order of Hermits of Saint Augustine on 18 September 1655.
On 18 March 1686, he was appointed during the papacy of Pope Gregory XIII as Bishop of Capodistria. On 25 March 1686, he was consecrated bishop by Alessandro Crescenzi (cardinal), Cardinal-Priest of Santa Prisca, with Giuseppe Eusanio, Titular Bishop of Porphyreon, and Pier Antonio Capobianco, Bishop Emeritus of Lacedonia, serving as co-consecrators. He served as Bishop of Capodistria until his death on 21 April 1713.

References 

17th-century Roman Catholic bishops in the Republic of Venice
18th-century Roman Catholic bishops in the Republic of Venice
Bishops appointed by Pope Gregory XIII
1632 births
1713 deaths
Augustinian bishops